Anda (also Romanized as Āndā) is a village in Eshkanan Rural District, Eshkanan District, Lamerd County, Fars Province, Iran. At the 2006 census, its population was 12, in 6 families.

References 

Populated places in Lamerd County